Najmeddin Ṭabasī (Persian: نجم الدین طبسی، born 1955) (complete name: Najmeddin Moraveji Tabasi) is an Iranian Twelver Shia cleric. He was born in Najaf and is a member of Society of Seminary Teachers of Qom.

Life
Najm al-Din Tabasi (also known as Najm al-Din Murawwiji Tabasi) is son of Mohammad Rida Tabasi who was born in Najaf. He pursued his education in hawza by taking classes of scholars like:

Sayyid Muhammad Rida Gulpayigani, Ali Panah Ishtihardi, Ja'far Subhani, Sayyid Ali Muhaqqiq Damad, Husayn Nuri Hamadani, Muhsin Haram Panahi, Mohammad Reza Golpaygani, Husayn Wahid Khurasani and Fadil Harandi.

Najm al-Din Tabasi is currently a member of:
 Shoraye Elmie Marakeze Takhasosi Mahdaviat (Scientific Council of the Specialized Center on Mahdawiyyat);
 Educational Research Institute of Mazahebi-Eslami (Islamic religions);
 Specialty Center of Tarbiyate-Mohaqeqe Mazahebi-Eslami (Researcher Training of Islamic Religions)

Works
He has authored scores of articles and books including:

1-Al-Imam al-Husayn fi Makkah al-Mukarramah

2-Ta Zuhur

3-Nishanaha-yi az Dawlat-e Maw'ud

4-Chashm Andazi be Hukumat-e Mahdi

5-Sawm 'Ashura Bayn al-Sunna wa al-Bid'a

6-Raj'at az Nazar-e Shi'a

7-Dajjal, Chirayi-ye Girya wa Sugwari

8-Ta'ammuli nu dar Nishaniha-ye Zuhur

9-Nigarishi dar Sufyani

10-Manaqib al-Shaykhayn fi al-Tafsir wa al-Hadith

11-Sayyid Hasani dar Khutbat al-Bayan

12-Nigarishi dar Riwayat-e Sayyid Hasani.

13-Rahbare Azadegan

14-Nazame Artesh Dar Eslam

15-Tabeed Dar Eslam

16-Ferqeyi Baraye Tafraqe

External links
 Official Website

References

Society of Seminary Teachers of Qom members
Living people
Iranian Shia clerics
1955 births
People from Najaf
People from Najaf Province